Exercise Croix du Sud is a military exercise held every two years in New Caledonia, its surrounding waters and airspace. Many countries in the Pacific region take part in these exercises, which usually focus on delivering humanitarian aid, evacuating civilians, and reestablishing security in the wake of a simulated disaster.

Overview

Croix du Sud is the French term for Southern Cross. It is the largest humanitarian assistance and disaster relief training exercise in the South Pacific. France hosts and organises the exercises through its New Caledonian Armed Forces, headquartered in Noumea.

In alternate years, the concept for the next Croix du Sud is developed through a desktop exercise called Equateur. A typical scenario would be a category-four cyclone disaster, resulting in poor sanitation, hunger, disease, and an outbreak of looting and rape which targets foreigners. Other scenarios have included extremists disrupting government control and inciting riots.

The Australian Department of Defence says Croix du Sud aims to maintain interoperability among regional defence and police forces. The exercise is also an opportunity to practise maritime surveillance, along with stability and security operations. The exercise takes place in accordance with a 1992 agreement between France, Australia and New Zealand.

Participants
Many countries whose militaries are active in the Pacific Ocean have committed personnel and equipment to the exercise. NGOs have also taken part. Participants in past exercises have included:

 Canada: Hercules transport aircraft.
 Chile: observers
 Fiji: observers an infantry platoon, patrol boat ,
 France: patrol ship D'Entrecasteaux.
 New Caledonia: Troupes de marine, vessels and troops of the Maritime Gendarmerie, National Gendarmerie, the frigate Vendémiaire, transport aircraft including CN-235, and local civilians.
 French Polynesia
 Japan
 New Zealand:  multi-role/strategic sealift vessel, patrol boat ,   helicopters, special forces  and an infantry platoon from the 1st Battalion of the Royal New Zealand Infantry Regiment.
 Papua New Guinea
 International Red Cross and Red Crescent Movement
 Singapore
 Solomon Islands
 Tonga:  patrol boat.
 United Kingdom: forces stationed in Brunei 
 United States: Marine Rotational Force – Darwin, troops from Hawaii including US Marines and infantry and civil affairs soldiers from the 9th Mission Support Command.
 Vanuatu: patrol boat.

References

External links
New Caledonian Armed Forces (French language).
Exercise Croix du Sud 2016 - Australian Department of Defence footage.
Exercise Croix du Sud concludes - Royal Australian Air Force, YouTube channel.

Military exercises and wargames
Military of France
Australian military exercises
Military exercises involving the United States